Jake McDonough (born November 3, 1989) is an American football defensive end who is currently a free agent. He signed as an undrafted free agent by the New York Jets in 2013. He played college football at Iowa State University.

He was also a member of the Indianapolis Colts, New York Jets, and Washington Redskins.

Early years 

He attended Valley High School in West Des Moines, Iowa. He was selected to the 2006 second-team Des Moines Register Class 4A all-state as a defensive lineman. He was selected to the 2007 second-team 4A all-state at the defensive lineman position and also was selected to the 2007 first-team all-state by Iowa Newspaper Association. He was selected to the 2007 first-team all-conference team.

College career 

He played college football at Iowa State as a defensive lineman. Prior to his Senior season, he was selected Phil Steele’s College Football Preview 2012 second-team All-Big 12 team.
While at Iowa State, he finished with a total of 89 Tackles, 5 Sacks, 3 Forced fumbles and one Forced fumble. He was named Iowa State Defensive Lineman of the Year (2012), All-Big 12 First-team (Coaches - 2012), All-Big 12 Honorable Mention (Associated Press - 2012), and was the Big 12 Defensive Lineman of the Year Honorable Mention (Coaches - 2012)

Professional career

New York Jets 

On April 27, 2013, he signed with the New York Jets as an undrafted free agent. On July 25, 2013, the Jets waived McDonough with an injury settlement.

Portland Thunder 
On October 30, 2013, McDonough was assigned to the Portland Thunder of the Arena Football League. In 2015, McDonough was awarded the Iron Man Award for most versatile player. He played both offensive  and defensive line, while also contributing on special teams.

Indianapolis Colts 
In December 2013, the Thunder placed McDonough on the other league exempt list when he was signed to the Indianapolis Colts practice squad.

He was waived by the Colts on February 18, 2014.

Washington Redskins
The Washington Redskins signed McDonough on July 30, 2014. He was waived on August 24.

References

External links
 Indianapolis Colts bio
 Iowa State Cyclones bio

1989 births
Living people
American football defensive ends
Iowa State Cyclones football players
New York Jets players
Omaha Mammoths players
Portland Thunder players
People from Urbandale, Iowa
Players of American football from Iowa